Henry Blair may refer to:

 Henry Blair (child actor), featured star of Sparky's Magic Piano
 Henry Blair (inventor) (1807–1860), second African American inventor to receive a patent
 Henry W. Blair (1834–1920), U.S. Representative and senator from New Hampshire

See also
Harry Blair (disambiguation)